Gurung may refer to:

 The Gurung people, an ethnic group of Nepal
 Gurung language
 Gurung (surname), with a list of people of this name
 Gurung Hill, a mountain in the Ladakh border area of China and India
 Gurung Hill, a peak near Annapurna in Nepal.